The Alberto Pérez Navarro is a multi-use stadium in Huixquilucan, State of Mexico, Mexico.  It is currently used mostly for football matches and is the home stadium for Tecamachalco F.C.  The stadium has a capacity of 3,000 people.

References

External links
Estadio Alberto Pérez Navarro (Dos Ríos)

Estadio Alberto Pérez Navarro
Athletics (track and field) venues in Mexico